Harry Orme (May 1826-9 June 1864) was a boxer from the bare-knuckle fighting era who was a candidate for heavyweight champion of England in the mid 19th century.

Early life
Harry Orme was born near Bow near the East End of London in May 1826.

Boxing career
Amongst other bouts, Orme fought and beat Nat Langham on the 6 May 1851, this being Langham's only career loss. Orme fought a championship bout against Harry Broome on 18 April 1853.

After retirement
Orme kept the pub Jane Shore in Shoreditch for many years until his death on 6 June 1864.

References

1826 births
People from Bow, London
Bare-knuckle boxers
English male boxers
1864 deaths
Boxers from Greater London